Briana Corrigan (born 30 May 1965) is a Northern Irish singer. She was the female singer for The Beautiful South from 1988 to 1992.

Early life
Corrigan was born in Northern Ireland. When she was 11 years old, her family moved from Belfast to Portstewart, County Londonderry. She moved to Newcastle upon Tyne in England at the age of 18 to study for a BA in creative and performing arts.

Beautiful South
While studying in Newcastle upon Tyne, Corrigan began singing with The Anthill Runaways. Go! Discs Records, which was considering signing the band, made her an offer to travel to Hull and sing with Paul Heaton and Dave Hemingway of The Beautiful South. Soon after she was asked to go to Milan with the band to help record their debut album, Welcome to the Beautiful South. She appeared alongside Dave Hemingway on the band's only UK Singles Chart number 1 single, "A Little Time".

After appearing on three albums, Corrigan left the band in 1992 to pursue a solo career. The decision was driven by a desire to record her own work and partly by ethical disagreements with some of Heaton's lyrics, particularly songs such as "36D", which criticised British glamour models and the industry that employed them. Hemingway later remarked, "We all agree that we should have targeted the media as sexist instead of blaming the girls for taking off their tops".

Her time with the band culminated in one of the fastest-selling British albums in history, Carry on up the Charts: The Best of the Beautiful South.

Solo career
After she left the band, Corrigan reunited with producer Mike Hedges who had produced the first two Beautiful South Albums, and recorded the solo critically acclaimed album, When My Arms Wrap You Round, in 1996 on East West Records. The first single, "Love Me Now", peaked on the UK Singles Chart at No.48. This was the only single released, as Corrigan and her record company parted company a few months after the album's release. Until October 2022, she taught singing at the British School al Khubairat.

Discography
Studio albums
 When My Arms Wrap You Round (1996)
 Red Bird (2012)

References

External links
Official website

1965 births
Living people
Women singers from Northern Ireland
Rock singers from Northern Ireland
Pop singers from Northern Ireland